Elizaveta Mikhailovna Levshina (born 13 December 1991) is a Russian former pair skater. With partner Konstantin Gavrin, she placed ninth at the 2007 World Junior Championships. They won two medals on the ISU Junior Grand Prix circuit and qualified for the 2005 ISU Junior Grand Prix Final.

Programs 
(with Gavrin)

Results 
(with Gavrin)

References

External links
 

Russian female pair skaters
1991 births
Living people
Figure skaters from Saint Petersburg